William John Burnett (1 March 1926 – 1988) was an English professional footballer who played as a winger.

References

1926 births
1988 deaths
People from Pelaw
Footballers from Tyne and Wear
English footballers
Association football wingers
Wardley Colliery Welfare F.C. players
Grimsby Town F.C. players
Hartlepool United F.C. players
English Football League players